The Class 4000 is a type of diesel multiple unit in service with NI Railways.

History
The fleet covers 20 DMUs procured by NI Railways. None of the Northern Irish rail network is electrified, and diesel multiple units have been used since nationalisation in the 1950s.

Prior to 2000, the NIR rolling stock consisted of a mixture of diesel multiple unit types that had entered service between 15 and 25 years previously. The main type was the Class 80, based on the Mark 2b bodyshell, 22 3-car and 4-car units built in two batches between 1973 and 1979. Additional capacity was provided with the Class 450, nine 3-car units that entered service in 1985 based on the Mark 3 bodyshell. Chronic underinvestment in the railway meant that by the millennium these were the newest domestic trains. By 2000 it was estimated that the network required investment of £183 million to bring it up to basic safety standards.

New trains
Recognising that the railways serve an important role in the growth of the local economy, the devolved Northern Ireland Assembly granted funding for improvements in December 2000 following the report of the Railways Task Force. Included was £80 million for rolling stock, the largest order in the history of NIR. The result was the Class 3000 DMU from CAF in Spain, 23 three-car units used to replace the increasingly outdated Class 80. They entered service between 2004 and 2005. This was a like-for-like replacement meaning that older rolling stock had to be retained, and NIR could not introduce the service enhancements it desired.

"New Trains Two"
The expanding economy led to increasing pressure to improve the rail network, with recommendations made in a debate in the Northern Ireland Assembly in May 2007. Among these was the purchase of rolling stock to replace the remaining Class 80 and Class 450 trains. Translink instituted the "New Trains 2010" (later renamed "New Trains Two") proposal for new trains, and decided that it needed to improve its service frequency to go with the associated infrastructure improvements, which would mean expanding the fleet. The proposal was that up to 20 trains would be purchased, which would replace the Class 450 and 80 units and expand the fleet by up to seven trains. The go-ahead was given on the publication of the draft budget of the Department for Regional Development, which allocated £137 million over three years to Translink, including for 20 trains.

Translink issued the invitation to tender (ITT) in June 2008. Three firm offers were received: Bombardier Transportation offered the Class 172 Turbostar being built for operation on the British network; Hyundai Rotem a variant of the 22000 Class ICR purchased by Iarnród Éireann (ruled out because of NIR's desire to have units with ⅓ and ⅔ spaced doors); and CAF a variant of the Class 3000 units. The similarity with the existing sets led to CAF winning the bid in March 2009. The first train was delivered in March 2011 and after testing it entered service in September 2011.

In the summer of 2021, testing began on increased six-car sets using extra intermediate carriages.

Timetable
The timetable for the introduction was released at the same time as the ITT:
June 2008 - Invitation to Tender
Wednesday 25 March 2009 - Contracts signed
June 2010 - Construction of first train begins
Monday 14 March 2011 - Delivery of first train
Thursday 29 September 2011 - First train enters passenger service
Tuesday 3 July 2012 - Final train arrives in Belfast
Wednesday 19 September 2012 - Final train entered service
Thursday 6 December 2018 - Order signed with CAF for an additional 21 Class 4000 carriages

Specification
Although the trains are externally similar to the C3K fleet, internally they have significant differences. Each three-car train has a seating capacity of 212, with fewer table bays and extra standing room. They have one toilet compared to the C3K's two. They have a new traction system, with an MTU 390kW engine providing power to both the traction motors and auxiliary generators. With a train being four tonnes lighter than a C3K unit, fuel economy is improved.

Usage

The trains have replaced the 13 remaining trains of Class 80 and Class 450. The capacity increase provided has allowed NIR to operate longer trains. Of the seven extra sets, NIR has earmarked five for running in six-car formations, with the other two planned to improve service frequency on the Derry-Londonderry Line once renovation work has been completed and a new crossing loop laid. The option was taken up in December 2018, when 21 additional vehicles were ordered from CAF at a cost of £50 million. The 21 additional vehicles will be used to lengthen seven of the twenty Class 4000 units to six-cars long to provide a train that the conductor can walk through fully, this means only 1 conductor is required. The first three-car set was extended in November 2021, with all six expected to be complete by July 2022.

Technical problems
It has been reported on several websites that at least one train has been taken out of service on several occasions with major engine failure and has been re-engined.

Testing is now underway as of September 2021.

Fleet details

References

External links

4000
CAF multiple units